Holly Dunn is the self-titled debut studio album by American country music artist Holly Dunn, released in 1986 through MTM Records. It includes her breakthrough hit, "Daddy's Hands".

Track listing

Chart performance

References

Holly Dunn albums
1986 debut albums
MTM Records albums
Albums produced by Tommy West (producer)